A coal trimmer or trimmer is a position within the engineering department of a coal-fired ship which involves all coal handling duties. Their main task is to ensure that coal is evenly distributed within a vessel to ensure it remains trim in the water. Their efforts to control the fore-and-aft angle at which a ship floats is the reason they’re called “trimmers”. Without proper management of the coal bunkers, ships could easily list due to uneven distribution of the coal. 

The role of trimmers starts with the bunkering of coal, distributing it evenly within the bunkers, and then providing a consistent delivery of coal to the stoker or fireman working the vessel’s boilers.

Coal trimming was also a role based at the docks and would involve levelling out the coal in a ships hold to ensure that the ship was safe to travel.  Coal was transported to the docks via train wagons and the coal was tipped into the ship. During the process of the coal being delivered into the hold of the ship it would form a conical pile. This would be unsafe for the ship to sail in case the coal moved to one side causing the ship to list and roll over.

Trimmers would shovel the coal out so that it was level and the ship was safe. It was a tough difficult job in dark and dangerous conditions.

Role
Within the engineering crew, trimmers had one of the hardest lowest paid jobs. Working conditions were hard because they worked directly inside the coal bunkers which were poorly lit, full of coal dust, and extremely hot due to them being located on top or between working boilers.

Trimmers used shovels and wheelbarrows to move coal around the bunkers in order to keep the coal level, and to shovel the coal down the coal chute to the firemen below who fueled the furnaces.

Trimmers were also involved in extinguishing fires in the coal bunkers. Fires occurred frequently due to spontaneous combustion of the coal. The fires had to be extinguished with fire hoses and by removing the burning coal by feeding it into the furnace.

Coal trimmers worked on various docks around the U.K. in the early part of the 19th century. They were skilled at their job and in some areas of the country formed unions such as the Cardiff, Penarth and Barry Coal Trimmers Association.

Notable coal trimmers

There were 73 trimmers aboard the coal-fed ocean liner RMS Titanic. During the sinking of the ship, these men disregarded their own safety and stayed below deck to help keep the steam-driven electric generators running for the water pumps and lighting. Only 20 trimmers were among those who survived.
Torsten Billman, a Swedish graphic artist, drawer, and mural painter – himself a coal trimmer and stoker on various merchant ships from 1926 to 1932 – has portrayed the hard work in coal bunkers and stokeholes.
Frank Bailey, a Guyanese-British firefighter was a coal trimmer.

References 

Construction and extraction occupations
Transport occupations
Marine occupations